Moongan is a rural locality in the Rockhampton Region, Queensland, Australia.

History 
The locality takes its name from its former railway station name, which is believed to be an Aboriginal word meaning top of hill.

Education 
There are no schools in Moongan. The nearest government primary and secondary schools are Mount Morgan State School and Mount Morgan State High School, both in Mount Morgan to the south.

References 

Suburbs of Rockhampton Region
Localities in Queensland